The 1822 territorial division of Spain was a rearrangement of the territory of Spain into various provinces, enacted briefly during the Trienio Liberal of 1820–1823. It is remembered today largely as a precursor to the similar 1833 territorial division of Spain; the provinces established in the latter remain, by and large, the basis for the present-day division of Spain into provinces.

Background
After the uprising led by liberal general Rafael del Riego of 1820 led to the Trienio Liberal (three years of government by the Spanish liberals), that government proposed a new division of Spain in its entirety, for administrative, governmental, judicial and economic purposes, according to criteria of legal equality, unity and efficiency. While the liberal government was crushed in 1823 by a  French intervention led by the similarly  restored French Bourbons, some of the reforms and ideas of the brief intermezzo would endure and form the basis of later government policy, in this case the very similar 1833 provincial subdivision of Spain which is still largely in place (albeit superseded in importance by the Autonomous Communities of Spain in many regards).

The provinces
On 27 January 1822 the government approved a provisional division of Spain into 52 provinces. The 1833 statute would follow this pattern closely, although it eliminated three of the provinces and renamed five others.

The following table groups provinces by the "historic regions" that were introduced in 1833.

Some of these provinces were entities created for the first time, such as Almería and Málaga (carved out of the traditional Kingdom of Granada), Huelva (Kingdom of Seville), Calatayud, and Logroño; others were given new names, such as Murcia or the Basque provinces.

This proposal made few concessions to history, sticking closely to criteria of population, geographical area, and geographic coherence. Historic regional names were generally ignored, with provinces named after their respective capitals. Nor were traditional provincial borders respected by the new map. Most enclaves of one province within another were eliminated. The precise number of provinces and their capitals was the subject of intense debate.

1822 saw the restoration of the institution of provincial intendants as delegates of the Ministry of the Treasury (Hacienda), but the fall of the liberal government and restoration of absolutism in 1823 brought an end to the project. The old provincial arrangement of Spain was restored, as was the division into kingdoms; these would remain in effect until 1833.

Notes

External links
  División provisional del territorio español de 27 de Enero de 1822, the text of the proposed 1822 territorial division of Spain, Instituto de Historia, Consejo Superior de Investigaciones Cientificas (CSIC, Spanish National Research Council).

1822 in Spain
Provinces of Spain
Subdivisions of Spain

es:Historia de la organización territorial de España#División territorial de 1822